Salati is a surname. 

The Salati surname is generally considered to be of Italian origin. Ancestral records date the surname back many centuries within Italy. 

It has been suggested that the ancient root of the Salati surname derives from the Pharaoh Salitis who ruled Egypt and who founded the 15th Dynasty. 

Notable people with the surname include:

 Alessandro Salati (    - 1509), Bishop of Minori from 1498 to 1509
 Armando Salati (1884–1963), Italian Vice Consul to the United States
 Enrico Salati (c1790-1869}, Prime Minister of the Duchy of Parma from 1849 to 1859
 Giovan M Salati (1796–1879), Napoleonic soldier
 Giuseppe Salati (1847-1930), author of L'Antica Gioi
 Octavio M. Salati (1914–2001), Professor of Electrical Engineering at the University of Pennsylvania

In history
 La Cappella Madonna della Grazia (c1600) the historic Salati family chapel in Gioi, Italy

In popular culture

The Salati Case, novel by Tobias Jones, Faber and Faber, 2009, 

Baci Salati, Italian film (comedy), Renato Zappala and Antonio Zeta, 2012

References